Ruddick is the surname of:

George Ruddick (1881–1949), Welsh rugby union and rugby league footballer
Maurice Ruddick (1912–1988), Afro-Canadian miner and a survivor of the 1958 Springhill Mining Disaster
Robert C. Ruddick (1861–1921), Canadian politician
Sara Ruddick (1935–2011), feminist philosopher and author

Variants
Reddick (disambiguation)
Riddick (disambiguation)
Roddick (disambiguation)
Ruddock (surname)